John or Johane Marange (Johane Marange) (1912-1963) was a Zimbabwean Apostolic leader, prophet, and founder of the Apostolic Church of John Marange.

Background
He was born Muchabaya Momberume (also spelled Ngomberume) near Bondwe Mountain in the Marange Tribal Trustland of Southern Rhodesia in 1912.

He was given the name Johanne Mubhabhatidzi Mupostori in 1932 July . He was educated as a Methodist. He was born in 1912 and at the age of 5years he began to receive the Holy Spirit(1917) He had brothers named Anorodi and Konoriyo. In 1932, when Marange was 20, he returned from journeys in the bush announcing a series of visions and encounters with Jesus Christ, calling him to be a Holy Spirit guided itinerant preacher and establish a new African church. 
In his visions he was also admonished that he should baptize people and observe the [Saturday] Sabbath (Sabata In Shona). He founded the largest independent church in Central Africa.
The main gathering of the church occurred at Passover feast named PASKA at Marange's village, lasting for seventeen days, and ending with communion.

See also
 Christianity in Zimbabwe

References

1912 births
1963 deaths
Zimbabwean Christians